Kwara State is a state in western Nigeria.

Kwara may also refer to:

 Kwara United F.C., a Nigerian football club in Kwara
 Qwara Province in Ethiopia
 Kwara, a common name of the western brush wallaby